The American Song Contest is an American music reality competition television series based on the Eurovision Song Contest. The first and only season of the series was hosted by Snoop Dogg and Kelly Clarkson, and consisted of eight episodes airing between March 21 and May 9, 2022 on NBC. It saw acts representing all 50 U.S. states, five territories, and Washington, D.C. compete for the title of Best Original Song. Over the course of the season, 56 competing entries were divided into five qualifying rounds leading to two 11-participant semi-finals, and culminating with a 10-participant final round, which aired as the season finale. Participants advanced from a qualifying round to a semi-final and from a semi-final to the final based on votes received by public voting or jury voting, or a combination thereof. The contest was won by the state of Oklahoma, which was represented by the song "Wonderland", performed by AleXa.

Promotion for the series was organized by NBC and included a commercial during the 2022 Super Bowl and a sweepstakes for listeners on iHeartRadio stations. Reception for the series was largely mixed, with many critics noting that it did not live up to its Eurovision origins; it was ultimately not renewed for a 2023 season.

Format 
The American Song Contest put artists head-to-head against other representatives in a series of qualifying rounds, leading to the semi-finals and a prime time final in a "March Madness" style. The winning act earns the title of Best Original Song. As initially announced in August 2020, the competition would feature professional musical artists such as solo singers, duos, or groups of up to six members from each of the 50 U.S. states. By May 2021, the format had been expanded to include all five populated U.S. territories and the nation's capital and federal district of Washington, D.C. The participating territories were American Samoa, Guam, Northern Mariana Islands, Puerto Rico, and the U.S. Virgin Islands. Acts could consist of solo artists, duos, bands, or a DJ.

Each representative performed an original song in the live television program broadcast across the country on NBC. The series lasted eight episodes, consisting of five episodes of qualifying rounds, followed by two episodes of semi-finals and one final. In each qualifying round, a 56-member jury of music industry professionals (one for each state and territory) selected one song to advance to the semi-finals, while three songs also advanced after a 35-hour viewer voting period, which tallied votes from a combination of the jury and fans. After the qualifying rounds, the jury also selected two "redemption songs" from the qualifying rounds to join in the semi-finals, bringing the total number of semi-finalists to 22. They were then divided into two 11-participant semi-finals. The same selection process was facilitated in the semi-finals to determine the 10 acts to compete in the final. The final results were presented in Eurovision style, with each jury member awarding their maximum 12 points, followed by the awarding of points from viewers. The viewer votes were weighted, with each state and territory being worth 12 points much like in Eurovision, thus giving all regions equal voting power while preventing populous states like California and Texas from dominating the voting process.

Production

Background 
The Eurovision Song Contest is an international song competition organized annually by the European Broadcasting Union (EBU) since 1956, which features participants representing primarily European countries. It ranks among the world's most-watched non-sporting events every year, with hundreds of millions of viewers globally. Viewing figures were low, ranging from 52,000 viewers in 2016 to 74,000 viewers in 2018.

Netflix licensed the video-on-demand rights for the 2019 and  contests. The OTT platform planned to release the musical comedy film Eurovision Song Contest: The Story of Fire Saga together with the 2020 contest. However, because of the contest's cancellation due to the COVID-19 pandemic, the film was released a month later, on June 26. The film became the most-streamed content on Netflix in the U.S. on its first weekend, and introduced American viewers to the Eurovision format and its popularity in Europe. Furthermore, a song from the film, "Husavik", was later nominated for the Academy Award for Best Original Song at the 2021 Oscars.

There were plans to develop an American version of Eurovision as early as 2006, with Ben Silverman (then chairman of production company Reveille) developing the contest for NBC to challenge American Idol. Silverman (currently co-CEO and chairman of production company Propagate) admitted in 2020 that he had been trying to pursue this project for 20 years, including when he was chairman of NBC.

Development 
Lenhoff brought up the idea, to which Björkman was hesitant, saying: "Why would we do that and how would that work?" Despite the initial rejection, Lenhoff persisted with the concept, adding: "It sounds like a brilliant idea with states competing instead of countries. Americans love music. Americans love competition. Americans love where they come from. They have an awesome amount of pride for their home state, for their hometown." Lenhoff then contacted fellow Swedish producer Peter Settman, who crafted the business plan for potential sponsors and TV networks. After announcing in 2019 that they have acquired the rights from the EBU to produce an American version of Eurovision, Björkman and his team received a call from Silverman saying, "You are not doing this without me. Period. That's not going to happen." 

The European Broadcasting Union announced NBC had acquired the rights to broadcast the competition on May 14, 2021. NBC announced the American Song Contest would have a mid-season or summer premiere in 2022 after releasing their fall schedule for the upcoming 2021–22 network television season. The producers were able to get NBC on board mainly due to their experience working with music shows such as The Voice and Songland. Silverman serves as executive producer for the program, while Audrey Morrissey is appointed as the showrunner. Propagate Content and Universal Television Alternative Studio serve as the production companies for the program. In a press statement, Silverman hoped that focusing on the mutual love and respect for music would unite a "fractional America." Deadline Hollywood reported that a corporation that centers around the competition has been founded, with former Propagate president Greg Lipstone appointed as President and Chief Operating Officer. The American Song Contest, Inc., aims to "develop and grow the Eurovision brand globally," which includes creating auxiliary businesses around the reality series, as well as expanding the franchise to countries that are not covered by Eurovision.

NBC originally scheduled the premiere for February 21, 2022, but the premiere was postponed in favor of America's Got Talent: Extreme due to COVID-19-related concerns involving the Omicron variant. The first live show was then rescheduled to March 21, with the finale moved to May 9, the same week as the Eurovision Song Contest 2022.

Rapper Snoop Dogg and pop singer Kelly Clarkson were introduced as presenters of the show. In a statement, Clarkson said: "I have been a fan and love the concept of Eurovision and am thrilled to bring the musical phenomenon to America. I'm so excited to work with Snoop and can't wait to see every state and territory represented by artists singing their own songs." Clarkson added during a virtual press conference: "We are so unfortunately divided... and having so many things going on – it's been a very hard couple of years and now it's getting more serious. Feeling like you are not isolated and that you are a part of something bigger than your everyday world is so important. That's what this show is going to do for people. Everyone is being represented. It's a really great concept in general but one that is very needed right now."

Participants 
An online submissions platform was launched in May 2021, allowing eligible artists aged 16 years and older to apply, with or without recording or publishing deals. Participants were required to list all states or territories with which they had "an authentic, deep connection" during the casting process, with the producers having the final say on which state or territory the artists would represent. The website stressed that submissions had to be original songs in any genre and could not have been released commercially. Songs that were released promotionally, such as on SoundCloud and on social media, could be submitted—given that all posts were to be deleted if selected. The producers teased the possibility of filming in Los Angeles or Atlanta between February and April 2022. However, filming was later confirmed to take place on the Universal Studios Lot in Universal City, California. Previously, Björkman had stated during an interview in The Euro Trip podcast that Las Vegas, Tampa, and Orlando were also considered to be the first host city.

NBC revealed the 56 competing artists on March 3, 2022, through an interactive map. Atlantic Records served as the exclusive music partner of the American Song Contest, with the original songs in the competition released in batches beginning March 21 at midnight Eastern Daylight Time.

Qualifying rounds 
In each qualifying round, 11-12 songs competed for four spots in the semi-final, with the outcome decided upon by the votes from a jury panel and a public vote. An automatic qualifier from each round was determined by the juries, while the remaining three spots were decided by a combination of the jury and public votes. Moreover, two artists with the highest streams to this point returned as "redemption picks" and would join the qualifiers in the semi-finals.

Qualifiers 1 
The first qualifier round was held on Monday, March 21. At the end of the broadcast, it was announced that the jury had selected Rhode Island to advance to the semi-final. On April 18, it was announced on The Kelly Clarkson Show that Wyoming had advanced to the semi-final, being the first redemption pick.

Qualifiers 2 
The second qualifier round was held on Monday, March 28. At the end of the broadcast, it was announced that the jury had selected Kentucky to advance to the semi-final. During the first semi-final, it was announced that New York had advanced to the semi-final, being the second redemption pick.

Qualifiers 3 
The third qualifier round was held on Monday, April 4. At the end of the broadcast, it was announced that the jury had selected Tennessee to advance to the semi-final. The final results of this qualifying round was announced on the fourth episode of the contest.

Qualifiers 4 
The fourth qualifier round was held on Monday, April 11. At the end of the broadcast, it was announced that the jury had selected Washington to advance to the semi-final.

Qualifiers 5 
The fifth qualifier round was held on Monday, April 18. At the end of the broadcast, it was announced that the jury had selected Michigan to advance to the semi-final.

Semi-finals 
The 22 semi-finalists were split into the two semi-finals that took place during the April 25 and May 2 episodes, respectively. In each semi-final, 11 songs competed for five spots in the grand final: an automatic qualifier from each semi-final was determined by the juries, while the remaining four spots were decided by the public votes. From both semi-finals combined, a total of ten performers would advance to the grand final on May 9.

Semi-final 1 
On April 19, NBC confirmed the first 11 semi-finalists who would compete in the first semi-final. The first semi-final was then held on Monday, April 25. At the end of the broadcast, it was announced that the jury had selected Washington to advance to the final. The public qualifiers for the final were announced at the beginning of the second semi-final, held the following week, and where Oklahoma, Colorado, Alabama, and Kentucky.

Semi-final 2 
The second semi-final was held on Monday, May 2. At the end of the broadcast, it was announced that the jury had selected Tennessee to advance to the final. On Wednesday, May 4, it was announced on E! Network that the public qualifiers to the final were Connecticut, American Samoa, Texas, and North Dakota.

Grand final 
The grand final took place on May 9 and served as the season finale of the series. Ten states and territories participated in the grand final, composed of the two jury qualifiers and the eight public vote qualifiers from the two semi-finals. The contest was won by the state of Oklahoma, represented by the song "Wonderland", performed by AleXa. As an interval act, Jimmie Allen performed his single "Down Home".

Detailed voting results

12 points 
Below is a summary of the maximum 12 points awarded by each region's professional juries.

National jury and spokespersons

National jury 
The winner of the American Song Contest was partly determined by a 56-member "national jury," with one member representing each state and territory. Their duty was to evaluate each entry based on the live performance, together with its "artistic expression, hit potential, originality, and visual impression." They were then divided into ten regions, namely: Midwest, Upper South, New England, Plains, Mountains, Lower South, Mid-Atlantic, Southwest, Territories, and Pacific. Jurors include:

Alabama – Amber Parker, program director, WTXT Tuscaloosa, iHeartMedia
Alaska – Quinn Christopherson, singer-songwriter
American Samoa – Joseph Fa'avae, founder, Island Block Network
Arizona – Double-L, music director, on-air personality, KNIX Phoenix, iHeartMedia
Arkansas – Kevin Mercer, program director, KHKN Little Rock, iHeartMedia
California – Dan McCarroll, former president of Capitol Records and WB Records
Colorado – Isaac Slade, frontman of the Fray
Connecticut – Jaime Levine, CEO, Seven Mantels, artist manager
Delaware – Christa Cooper, on-air personality / assistant program director, WDSD Wilmington, iHeartMedia
Florida – Jose Tillan, director/producer – The POPGarage
Georgia – Jennifer Goicoechea, SVP A&R Sony Music, EPIC
Guam – Heidi Chargualaf Quenga, executive director, Chamorro Cultural Advisor
Hawaii – Eric Daniels, keyboardist/arranger, The Voice
Idaho – Shari Short, singer/songwriter/producer
Illinois – Mike Knobloch, president, music and publishing, NBCUniversal
Indiana – Nancy Yearing, talent development
Iowa – Taylor J., program director / on-air personality KKDM Des Moines, iHeartMedia
Kansas – Michelle Buckles, program director, KZCH Wichita, iHeartMedia
Kentucky – Ashley Wilson, director of country programming, Kentucky/Indiana, iHeartMedia
Louisiana – Uptown Angela, Executive Vice President of Programming, format lead custom R&B/gospel, iHeartMedia
Maine – Lauren Wayne, general manager, talent buyer, State Theater
Maryland – Caron Veazey, Founder & CEO, Something in Common
Massachusetts – Jamie Cerreta, EVP Hipgnosis Songs Group
Michigan – Shahida Mausi, CEO The Right Productions, Inc./Aretha Franklin Amphitheatre
Minnesota – Barry Lather, creative director, choreographer, producer
Mississippi – Joe King the Big Daddy, program director, WZLD Hattiesburg, iHeartMedia
Missouri – Tommy Austin, SVP Programming, iHeartMedia
Montana – Stephanie Davis, singer-songwriter
Nebraska – Hoss Michaels, program director, KXKT Omaha, iHeartMedia
Nevada – Jim Vellutato, CEO, Arrival Music
New Hampshire – Charlie Singer, music television producer, executive producer
New Jersey – Matt Pinfield, nationally syndicated radio host, A&R consultant, former MTV host of 120 Minutes
New Mexico – Tony Manero, SVP Programming Southwest, iHeartMedia
New York – Tom Poleman, Chief Programming Officer & President, iHeartMedia
North Carolina – Paul Schadt, on-air personality, WKKT Charlotte, iHeartMedia
North Dakota – Allison Bostow, program director / on-air personality, KIZZ Minot, iHeartMedia
Northern Mariana Islands – Galvin Deleon Guerrero, President of Northern Marianas College, radio DJ
Ohio – Khirye Tyler, songwriter, producer, musical director
Oklahoma – Ester Dean, singer-songwriter
Oregon – Mark Hamilton, program director / on-air personality, Portland Audacy
Pennsylvania – Ty Stiklorius, Founder & CEO of Friends at Work
Puerto Rico – Carlos Perez, creative director
Rhode Island – Kristin Lessard, on-air personality, WSNE Providence, iHeartMedia
South Carolina – Miss Monique, on-air personality / program director, WXBT Columbia, iHeartMedia
South Dakota – Jered Johnson, President / CEO, Pepper Entertainment
Tennessee – Brian Phillips, Executive VP, Content and Audience, Cumulus Media
Texas – Natural, music producer
U.S. Virgin Islands – Ajanie Williams, music producer & author
Utah – Jeff McCartney, SVP Programming, Salt Lake City, iHeartMedia
Vermont – Lee Chesnut, A&R Consultant
Virginia – Justin Derrico, musician
Washington – Zann Fredlund, on-air personality, music director & assistant program director, KBKS Seattle, iHeartMedia
Washington, D.C. – Dustin Matthews, Director of Rock Programming, Washington, DC, iHeartMedia
West Virginia – Judy Eaton, program director, WTCR Huntington, iHeartMedia
Wisconsin – Shanna "Quinn" Cudeck, program director / on-air personality, WMIL Milwaukee, iHeartMedia
Wyoming – Ian Munsick, Warner Music recording artist

Spokespersons 
All 56 juries were geographically divided in the grand final and selected the following spokespersons who announced the 12-point score from their respective regional juries chronologically:

Episodes

Marketing 
NBC News produced a report promoting the casting process of the American Song Contest, which was then distributed to its affiliate stations across the U.S. and its territories. It featured an interview with supervising casting producer Michelle McNulty, stating that they were "looking for the next big hit single, like those anthem songs... that just get in your head and can't get them out." The Italian rock band Måneskin, winners of the Eurovision Song Contest 2021, performed during the Top 10 episode of The Voice season 21, in which host Carson Daly promoted the American Song Contest as "the U.S. version of Eurovision." NBC released a promotional video for the American Song Contest on their Twitter account on December 15, 2021, stating that it'll be "the biggest live music event America has ever seen", with songs from all genres competing. An advertisement that introduces Snoop Dogg and Clarkson as the show's presenters debuted before the Super Bowl LVI halftime show. Clarkson had previously performed a cover of "Arcade" by Dutch singer Duncan Laurence, the winning song of the Eurovision Song Contest 2019, at her talk show. Radio stations affiliated with iHeartRadio have introduced sweepstakes in relation to the American Song Contest to listeners for a chance to win gift cards.

International broadcasting 
The show is also broadcast in multiple European countries, as well as in Australia and Canada:

AustraliaSBS Viceland
Austria and GermanyServusTV 
 CanadaCHCH-DT
 EstoniaTV3
 FinlandYle TV2
 GreeceERT
 IcelandRÚV
 MontenegroRTCG
 NorwayNRK
 PortugalRTP
 SerbiaRTS
 SloveniaRTVSLO
 SpainRTVE Play
 SwedenSVT

Reception
The concept of producing an American version of Eurovision was initially met with lukewarm reactions. Andy Kryza of Time Out wrote that the American Song Contest's biggest challenge is "the relative homogeneity of the American musical landscape," that its pop stars need to be paired with colorful performers like drag queens, wrecking crews, clowns, gospel singers, and the like. Justin Kirkland of Esquire predicted that the contest will be "a colossal nightmare," adding that Americans "lack the self-deprecation, campiness, and selfless energy to pull this off." Chris Murphy of Vulture.com pointed out that the television landscape in the United States is saturated with singing and talent competitions, adding that "no one's gonna write a song as catchy as 'Husavik'."

In an interview with BBC Breakfast in 2020, Cheryl Baker (member of the winning act in the ) opined that the competition will not translate well in the U.S., adding that the country "has got a long way to go to get the kitsch, the cheese, and the fun element" of the contest. Baker also suggested that the U.S. should bring a representative to Eurovision instead.

When asked about the possibility of competing in the American Song Contest, Flo Rida explained that it would be "a dream come true."

Writing for The Guardian, Adam Gabbatt was excited about "the mouth-watering prospect of seeing how politically and culturally opposed states rate the musical output of their rivals." Gabbatt explained how conservative viewers in Texas and liberal audiences in New York could express their mutual dislike for one another, or how voters might turn against Florida due to the anti-mask and vaccine-skeptic crusade of the state's current governor. Fellow The Guardian columnist Stuart Heritage described the list of participants as "breathtakingly starry," referring to artists who "already have their own Wikipedia page," which he took as a sign that the producers are "taking this thing seriously."

Reacting to the premiere episode, Kevin Fallon of The Daily Beast commented that it was a "big ole meh," while pointing out the performances of Oklahoma's AleXa and Puerto Rico's Christian Pagán as the highlights of the night. Fallon added that while Wyoming's entry "New Boot Goofin'" was "undeniably the worst song of the night," he predicted that its irresistibility would become the show's "greatest success story." Emily Yahr of The Washington Post also wrote praises about "New Boot Goofin'", adding that it "immediately stole the show's social media thunder" and it could be "the song of the summer." Yahoo! Music's editor-in-chief Lyndsey Parker wrote that the first episode of the American Song Contest "failed to live up to Eurovision's wacky promise or premise."

Cancellation
Björkman announced during Spain's Benidorm Fest in early February 2023 that the series was not renewed for a 2023 season.

Awards and nominations

Notes

References

External links
 Official website
 Casting website
 

 
2020s American music television series
2020s American reality television series
2022 American television series debuts
American television spin-offs
Annual television shows
English-language television shows
Eurovision Song Contest
Impact of the COVID-19 pandemic on television
Impact of the COVID-19 pandemic on the music industry
Music competitions in the United States
NBC original programming
Reality television spin-offs
Recurring events established in 2022
Song contests
Television series by Universal Television